The Landfill Disposals Tax (LDT) is part of the UK tax system and from 6 April 2019 is collected by the Welsh Revenue Authority and the money is used to support public services in Wales. The Landfill Disposals Tax replaced Landfill Tax in Wales from 1 April 2018. The Landfill Disposals Tax (Wales) Act 2017, which received Royal Assent on 7 September 2017, is a tax on the disposal of waste to landfill and is charged by weight. The Welsh Revenue Authority has collected and manages both the Land Transaction Tax and Landfill Disposals Tax in Wales since 2018.

There are 3 rates of LDT:

Lower rate for materials which meet the conditions set out in the Landfill Disposals Tax (Wales) Act 2017
Standard rate for all other material
Unauthorised disposals rate. This is for taxable disposals made at places other than authorised landfill sites.

LDT tax rates

References

External links
 Welsh Government official website

Taxation in Wales